FC Kosmos Pavlohrad was a professional Ukrainian football club based in Pavlohrad, Ukraine.

Before 1985, the club carried the name Kolos. From 1986 to 1995, it played under the name Shakhtar. In 1994, it merged with another amateur club, Kosmos Pavlohrad, under the name Shakhtar Pavlohrad. In 1995, it changed its name to Kosmos Pavlohrad.

See also
 FC Hirnyk Pavlohrad

 
Football clubs in Pavlohrad
Kosmos Pavlohrad
Kosmos Pavlohrad
Kosmos Pavlohrad
1973 establishments in Ukraine
1995 disestablishments in Ukraine
Kolos (sports society)
Agrarian association football clubs in Ukraine